Patrick Daniel Tambay (25 June 1949 – 4 December 2022) was a French racing driver, commentator, and politician, who competed in 123 Formula One races between 1977 and 1986, securing five pole positions and winning twice.

He gained training as a racing driver at Winfield Racing School in France in 1971. Between 1977 and 1981, he raced for an assortment of teams including Surtees, Theodore, Ligier, and McLaren with mixed results; he additionally won two Can Am championships under Carl Haas in 1977 and 1980. Tambay was hired by Scuderia Ferrari after his close friend Gilles Villeneuve died during the 1982 Belgian Grand Prix; he took his maiden victory four races later in Germany. His second and final victory came the following year in emotional circumstances at Imola. In 1984, Tambay moved to Renault and ended his F1 career at Haas Lola.

Tambay competed in various forms of motorsport following his departure from Formula One, including the 24 Hours of Le Mans, the World Sportscar Championship, and the Dakar Rally.

Racing career

Early in his career, Tambay was a part of Formula 5000 with the team run by Carl Haas.

In 1977, winning the Can Am championship with Haas, Tambay debuted in Formula One on a one-off basis with Surtees, driving in only one session at the 1977 French Grand Prix before spending the rest of the season with Theodore. This partnership proved fruitful, and Tambay moved to McLaren to race Formula One full-time for the 1978 and 1979 seasons. In 1980, he returned to Can Am with the Lola team run by Carl Haas, immediately winning early in the season and then winning his second Can-Am championship.

In 1981 he returned to F1, first driving for the Theodore team then finishing the season with Ligier.

In 1982, he was offered a drive with Arrows by team boss Jackie Oliver to replace the injured Marc Surer in the season-opening South African Grand Prix. He arrived at the track and, when faced with the ongoing turmoil and the possibility of a drivers' strike, he soon left and did not take part in the race. Later in 1982 he was offered a place with the Scuderia Ferrari after the death of his close friend Gilles Villeneuve. He won his first Grand Prix at the German Grand Prix that year after Didier Pironi was injured in qualifying, in his fourth race for Ferrari. He took his second and last Grand Prix win in 1983 at Imola; driving with Villeneuve's #27, he won an emotional victory in front of the Tifosi after Riccardo Patrese crashed near the end of the race. He was dropped by the team in 1984 in favor of Italian Michele Alboreto. Tambay moved to Renault, and then spent a year reunited with his old boss Carl Haas racing in the Haas Lola F1 team.

In 1987, Tambay formed his own sports promotion company in Switzerland, but gave this up in 1989 to return to racing. In 1989, he drove a Jaguar in the World Sportscar Championship and went on to finish fourth in the Le Mans 24 Hours. He then took up desert rally raiding, finishing twice in the top three on the Paris-Dakar. Additionally, he was involved in ice races and the Tour de Corse jet ski race.

Later life and death
After retiring from full-time racing, Tambay worked as a commentator for French television. He also served as the deputy mayor of Le Cannet, a suburb of Cannes. He was the godfather to 1997 World Champion Jacques Villeneuve, while his son Adrien raced in the DTM championship between 2012 and 2016. After suffering from Parkinson's disease for several years, Tambay died on 4 December 2022, at age 73. His son Adrien announced his death.

Racing record

Career summary

 Graded drivers not eligible for  European Formula Two Championship points.

Complete European Formula Two Championship results
(key) (Races in bold indicate pole position; races in italics indicate fastest lap)

 Graded drivers not eligible for  European Formula Two Championship points

Complete Formula One World Championship results
(key) (Races in bold indicate pole position; Races in italics indicate fastest lap)

24 Hours of Le Mans results

Complete Grand Prix Masters results
(key) Races in bold indicate pole position, races in italics indicate fastest lap.

Complete Canadian-American Challenge Cup results
(key) (Races in bold indicate pole position) (Races in italics indicate fastest lap)

Explanatory notes

Citations

General and cited references 

1949 births
2022 deaths
24 Hours of Le Mans drivers
Dakar Rally drivers
Deaths from Parkinson's disease
Ensign Formula One drivers
European Formula Two Championship drivers
Ferrari Formula One drivers
Formula One race winners
French Formula One drivers
French racing drivers
Grand Prix Masters drivers
Haas Lola Formula One drivers
Jaguar Racing drivers
Ligier Formula One drivers
McLaren Formula One drivers
Oreca drivers
Racing drivers from Paris
Renault Formula One drivers
Surtees Formula One drivers
Theodore Formula One drivers
World Sportscar Championship drivers